Peter Anderson Kemp (8 April 1877 – 9 June 1965) was a British competitive swimmer and water polo player of the late 19th and early 20th centuries.  He participated in water polo and swimming at the 1900 Summer Olympics in Paris, and won a bronze medal in the 200-metre obstacle event, and a gold medal in water polo as a member of the British team.

See also
 Great Britain men's Olympic water polo team records and statistics
 List of Olympic medalists in swimming (men)
 List of Olympic medalists in water polo (men)
 List of Olympic champions in men's water polo

References

External links
 

1877 births
1965 deaths
British male backstroke swimmers
British male water polo players
Olympic bronze medallists for Great Britain
Olympic gold medallists for Great Britain
Olympic bronze medalists in swimming
Olympic medalists in water polo
Olympic swimmers of Great Britain
Olympic water polo players of Great Britain
Swimmers at the 1900 Summer Olympics
Water polo players at the 1900 Summer Olympics
People from Galashiels
Medalists at the 1900 Summer Olympics
Olympic gold medalists in swimming
Scottish male freestyle swimmers
Sportspeople from the Scottish Borders